Playing It My Way is the autobiography of former Indian cricketer Sachin Tendulkar. It was launched on 5 November 2014 in Mumbai. The book summarises Tendulkar's early days, his 24 years of international career and aspects of his life that have not been shared publicly. It entered the Limca Book of Records for being the best selling adult hardback across both fiction and non-fiction categories. In India, it broke the record set by Walter Isaacson's biography of Steve Jobs for being the most pre-ordered biographical book.

Accuracy 
In the book, Tendulkar mentioned that just months before the 2007 Cricket World Cup, Greg Chappell, then the coach of the Indian cricket team, visited Tendulkar at his home and suggested that he should take over the captaincy from Rahul Dravid, then the team captain. Chappell however denied this, stating that he never contemplated Tendulkar replacing Dravid as captain. The book has also been criticised for many factual errors, particularly with the scorecards.

Release 
Playing It My Way was released on 6 November 2014. It was entered in the Limca Book of Records for 2016.

References 

2014 non-fiction books
Cricket books
Sports autobiographies
Indian autobiographies
Sachin Tendulkar
Hodder & Stoughton books
Hachette (publisher) books
Indian biographies
21st-century Indian books